Amaranthus floridanus, the Florida amaranth, is a flowering plant endemic to Florida.

Amaranthus floridanus flowers from late spring to fall and can grow up to 1.5 m in height. It usually grows in moist places, near dunes, swamps, marshes, or in disturbed habitats.

References

floridanus
Endemic flora of Florida
Plants described in 1882